Angier may refer to:

People
 Bradford Angier (1910–1997), American author and survivalist
 Carole Angier (born 1943), English biographer
 John Angier (1605–1677), English nonconformist minister
 Milton Angier (1899–1967), American javelin thrower
 Natalie Angier (born 1958), American nonfiction writer and science journalist
 Nedom L. Angier (1814–1882), American politician, mayor of Atlanta, Georgia
 Samuel Angier (1639–1713), English nonconformist minister, nephew of John Angier
 Angier Biddle Duke (1915–1995), American ambassador and Chief of Protocol of the United States
 Angier March Perkins (1799–1881), American engineer

Places
 Anyer, Indonesia, also spelled Angier, a town
 Angier, North Carolina, US, a town

Fictional characters
 Rupert Angier, in the novel The Prestige (renamed Robert Angier in film version)

Masculine given names